The 2016 St Kilda Football Club season was the 120th in the club's history. Coached by Alan Richardson and captained by Nick Riewoldt, they competed in the AFL's 2016 Toyota Premiership Season.

Season summary

Pre-season

Regular season

Standings

References

External links
 
 Listing of St Kilda game results in 2016

St Kilda Football Club seasons